The following is a list of Michigan State Historic Sites in Leelanau County, Michigan. Sites marked with a dagger (†) are also listed on the National Register of Historic Places in Leelanau County, Michigan.


Current listings

See also
 National Register of Historic Places listings in Leelanau County, Michigan

Sources
 Historic Sites Online – Leelanau County. Michigan State Housing Developmental Authority. Accessed March 13, 2011.

References

Leelanau County
State Historic Sites
Tourist attractions in Leelanau County, Michigan